Wayne Stuart Aiken (August 5, 1935 – April 27, 2012) was a Canadian football halfback and linebacker who played for the Calgary Stampeders of the Canadian Football League. He played in 14 regular season games from 1959 to 1960. On defense, he recorded two tackles and three interceptions. On offense, he rushed three times for three total yards. He also participated on special teams as a punt returner, receiving 12 punts for 58 return yards.

References 

1935 births
2012 deaths
Calgary Stampeders players
Canadian football linebackers
Canadian football running backs
Players of Canadian football from Ontario
UBC Thunderbirds football players